The Masked Singer Austria is an Austrian reality singing competition television series adapted from the South Korean format King of Mask Singer. The first season premiered on Puls 4 on 14 March 2020, and is hosted by Arabella Kiesbauer. The show features celebrities singing in head-to-toe costumes and face masks which conceal their identities from other contestants, panelists, and an audience.

On 19 March 2020, Puls 4 announced that the production would be interrupted due to the COVID-19 pandemic in Austria. The program continued on 15 September 2020.

Panelists and host

Arabella Kiesbauer served as host of the series for its first season. Kiesbauer was replaced by Mirjam Weichselbraun for the second season. Since the first season, the panelists consist of Elke Winkens and Sasa Schwarzjirg. Nathan Trent served as a third panelist in the first season before being replaced by Rainer Schönfelder for the second.

Series overview

Reception

Ratings

Notes

References

External links
 
 The Masked Singer Austria on Internet Movie Database

Austrian television series
2020 Austrian television series debuts
2020s Austrian television series
German-language television shows
Austrian television series based on South Korean television series
Masked Singer
Puls 4 original programming